Bowcombe is a hamlet on the Isle of Wight. Public transport is provided by Southern Vectis buses on route 12.

Geography
The hamlet gives its name to the nearby Bowcombe Down and 2000-acre Bowcombe View Shooting Ground. The down is home to a listed historical site that contains a Bronze Age barrow and an Anglo-Saxon cemetery.

History
Bowcombe was mentioned in the Doomsday Book at the time it had 60 households, which was very large for a settlement at the time, with a total value of £20 in 1066.  In 1870–72 John Marius said of the village in the Imperial Gazetteer "Bowcombe vale, around it, formerly displayed much beauty, but has suffered by destruction of its wood." In the account, it describes that to the west there are traces of a Roman road and that it "commands a rich and extensive view." At the time it had a population of 93.

Notable residents
Sir William Stephens (c. 1641 – 1697) Member of Parliament.

References

External links

Villages on the Isle of Wight